The American Farewell Tour is a compilation album by American country music band Alabama, released in 2003. Although titled as The American Farewell Tour, a tour that Alabama undertook in 2003, the album is actually a compilation of songs released by Alabama over the years.

Commercial performance

The album peaked at number 6 on the Billboard Top Country Albums chart.  The album has sold 650,800 copies in the United States as of October 2019.

Track listing

Charts

Weekly charts

Year-end charts

Certifications

References

2003 compilation albums
Alabama (band) compilation albums
RCA Records compilation albums